Diplodus is a genus of fish in the family Sparidae, found in the Atlantic and Indian Ocean.

Species
There are currently 23 recognized species in this genus:
 Diplodus annularis (Linnaeus, 1758) (Annular seabream)
 Diplodus argenteus (Valenciennes, 1830) (Silver seabream)
 Diplodus ascensionis (Valenciennes, 1830) 
 Diplodus bellottii (Steindachner, 1882) (Senegal seabream)
 Diplodus bermudensis D. K. Caldwell, 1965 (Bermuda seabream)
 Diplodus cadenati de la Paz, Bauchot & Daget, 1974 (Moroccan white seabream) 
 Diplodus capensis (A. Smith, 1844) (Cape white seabream)
 Diplodus caudimacula (Poey, 1860) 
 Diplodus cervinus (R. T. Lowe, 1838) (Zebra seabream)
 Diplodus fasciatus (Valenciennes, 1830) (Banded seabream)
 Diplodus helenae (Sauvage, 1879) (St. Helena white seabream) 
 Diplodus holbrookii (T. H. Bean, 1878) (Spot-tail seabream)
 Diplodus hottentotus (A. Smith, 1844)
 Diplodus kotschyi (Steindachner, 1876) (One-spot seabream) 
 Diplodus levantinus R. Fricke, Golani & Appelbaum-Golani, 2016 
 Diplodus lineatus (Valenciennes, 1830) 
 Diplodus noct (Valenciennes, 1830) (Red Sea seabream)
 Diplodus omanensis Bauchot & Bianchi, 1984 (Oman seabream)
 Diplodus prayensis Cadenat, 1964 (Two-banded seabream)
 Diplodus puntazzo (Walbaum, 1792) (Sharp-snout seabream)
 Diplodus sargus (Linnaeus, 1758) (White seabream)
 Diplodus striatus (Bliss, 1883) 
 Diplodus vulgaris (É. Geoffroy Saint-Hilaire, 1817) (Common two-banded seabream)

References

 
Sparidae
Marine fish genera
Taxa named by Constantine Samuel Rafinesque